VHD may refer to:

 Rabbit haemorrhagic disease, also known as Viral Haemorrhagic Disease
 Valvular heart disease, a disease involving one or more of the four valves of the heart
 VHD (file format), or Virtual Hard Disk file format, a disk image format used by Microsoft's Hyper-V, successor to Windows Virtual PC, successor to Microsoft Virtual PC
 Video High Density, a videodisc format
 Volumetric Haptic Display, a display that similar informs touch instead of vision
 Vehicle hours of delay, a measure of congestion used in transportation engineering and planning